France has had at least three ships named Vulcain:
 , a 110-gun ship of the line launched in 1806.  She was renamed Commerce (1830), Borda (1839), and finally Vulcain (1863) and was scrapped in 1885.
Her fate is unknown.
 , a Vulcain-class minesweeper launched in 1986 and currently in service.

French Navy ship names